Project 131 Libelle Torpedo boat, also known as the Libelle Klasse (German, 'Dragonfly Class'), was a class of torpedo boats designed, build and used by the German Democratic Republic during the Cold War.

Setup 
The Libelle class was based on a welded metal hull, housing a fuel tank and a total of three soviet M-50F4 diesel engines, one to the rear and two to the front. The hull also contained one 533-mm torpedo tube on each side. Project 131 carried no reloads for the torpedo tubes. The boats were designed for short ranges only and were meant to operate from floating bases (projects 62 and 162), anchored close to their area of operation. Each Project 131 boat had a small compartment in the bow to accommodate the crew for some time.

On the deck, there was a pilothouse with four seats and an elevated seat in the center for the helmsman. On both sides of the pilothouse, removable ejectors for sea mines could be mounted. On the aft deck, a rear facing ZU-23-2 23 mm gun was mounted for air defence. The torpedoes were ejected to the rear, but faced forward, so that they were initially following the boat's course after hitting the water.

Production and service 
30 boats were built in Rechlin and equipped in the Peene-Werft between 1974 and 1977.

The 30 boats were not given any names but had the numbers 131.401 to 131.430 assigned to them. One was lost in a collision off Hiddensee in 1986, the others were retired around 1989, with four boats being preserved.

References

Further reading 
 

Ships of the Volksmarine
Naval ships of East Germany
Torpedo boat classes
Ships built in Rechlin